XHHLL-FM 97.1 / XEHLL-AM 550 is a combo radio station in Salina Cruz, Oaxaca, Mexico carrying the Los 40 format.

History
The concession for XEUC-AM was awarded to Eduardo Martínez Celis in 1962. In the 1980s, López Lena bought the station; he changed its calls to XEHLL-AM "Radio Mar" in 1991 and moved it from Tehuantepec to Salina Cruz. XEHLL became an AM-FM combo with the award of XHHLL-FM in 1994 and began calling itself "Estéreo Mar".

External links
 Los 40 Salina Cruz Facebook

References

Contemporary hit radio stations in Mexico
Radio stations in Oaxaca